Comensoli is a surname. Notable people with the surname include:

 Geltrude Comensoli (1847–1903), Italian saint
 Mario Comensoli (1922–1993), Swiss painter
 Peter Comensoli (born 1964), Australian Catholic bishop